Jamaal Smith (born 22 February 1988) is a Canadian-born Guyanese international footballer who plays for Alpha United, as a defender.

Career

College career
Smith played college soccer for the York Lions, winning CIS championships in 2008 and 2010. He also represented Canada at the Universiade in 2009 and 2011.

Club career
In 2007, he won a tryout for Major League Soccer expansion side Toronto FC, beating out over 900 participants, earning an invite to pre-season, but ultimately failed to make the squad.

Smith has played club football for Italia Shooters, SC Toronto, Syrianska Kerburan, K-W United FC, Caledonia AIA, Okzhetpes and Vaughan Azzurri.

He signed for Caledonia AIA in August 2013. His debut for Caledonia came in a 3-1 away defeat to Mexican club Toluca in the CONCACAF Champions League a few days later.

In April 2015 he was playing for Alpha United.

International career
Born in Canada, he made his international debut for Guyana in 2012, and has appeared in FIFA World Cup qualifying matches for them. He also represented them at the 2012 Caribbean Cup.

International career statistics

Personal life
He is the older brother of Jelani Smith, who was also a soccer player for Guyana.

References

1988 births
Living people
Canadian soccer players
Guyanese footballers
Guyana international footballers
Canadian sportspeople of Guyanese descent
Black Canadian soccer players
SC Toronto players
Syrianska IF Kerburan players
K-W United FC players
TT Pro League players
Morvant Caledonia United players
FC Okzhetpes players
Alpha United FC players
Association football defenders
Canadian expatriate soccer players
Canadian expatriate sportspeople in Sweden
Canadian expatriate sportspeople in Trinidad and Tobago
Canadian expatriate sportspeople in Kazakhstan
Guyanese expatriate footballers
Guyanese expatriate sportspeople in Sweden
Guyanese expatriate sportspeople in Trinidad and Tobago
Guyanese expatriate sportspeople in Kazakhstan
Expatriate footballers in Sweden
Expatriate footballers in Trinidad and Tobago
Expatriate footballers in Kazakhstan
Canadian Soccer League (1998–present) players
York Region Shooters players
Vaughan Azzurri players